Floyd Gass (January 31, 1927 – March 3, 2006) was an American football and basketball player, coach, and college athletics administrator.  He served as the head football coach at Austin College from 1961 to 1968, having previously been offensive coordinator, and at Oklahoma State University–Stillwater from 1969 to 1971, compiling a career college football record of 56–46–2.  He was voted the Big Eight Conference Coach of the Year in 1969.  His record was 13–18–1 in his three seasons at Oklahoma State.  Gass was also the head basketball coach at Austin College from 1955 to 1962, tallying a mark of 71–80, and served as athletic director.  He was an alumnus of Oklahoma State, and played football and basketball while attending the university.  Gass was one of three head football coaches at Oklahoma State to have played for Oklahoma State, along with Jim Lookabaugh and current head coach Mike Gundy. Gass served as athletics director at OSU from 1971 through 1978, when he left OSU to pursue other business opportunities.  Gass died on March 3, 2006, at the age of 79.

Head coaching record

Football

References

External links
 Floyd Gass' obituary

1927 births
2006 deaths
American men's basketball players
Basketball coaches from Oklahoma
Austin Kangaroos athletic directors
Austin Kangaroos football coaches
Austin Kangaroos men's basketball coaches
Oklahoma State Cowboys and Cowgirls athletic directors
Oklahoma State Cowboys football coaches
Oklahoma State Cowboys football players
Oklahoma State Cowboys basketball players
People from Osage County, Oklahoma